"Rollercoaster" is the first episode of the American animated musical-comedy television series Phineas and Ferb. The episode was originally broadcast on Disney Channel in the United States on August 17, 2007 as a preview of the series. The episode follows series protagonists Phineas and Ferb building an extremely large roller coaster starting in their backyard and going throughout the city.

"Rollercoaster" was written by co-creators Dan Povenmire and Jeff "Swampy" Marsh, the former of whom also directed the episode. The two used the episode to pitch the series to Disney. They recorded a set of storyboard reels, which Povenmire voiced over and sent them overseas. The preview of the episode totaled a combined 10.8 million viewers. In 2011, the episode was remade into a half-hour musical episode titled "Rollercoaster: The Musical!".

Voice cast
 Vincent Martella as Phineas Flynn
 Thomas Sangster as Ferb Fletcher
 Ashley Tisdale as Candace Flynn
 Alyson Stoner as Isabella Garcia-Shapiro
 Caroline Rhea as Linda Flynn
 Dee Bradley Baker as Perry the Platypus
 Dan Povenmire as Dr. Heinz Doofenshmirtz, Factory Manager
 Jeff "Swampy" Marsh as Major Monogram

Plot summary
Phineas (Vincent Martella) and his stepbrother Ferb (Thomas Brodie-Sangster) are sitting lazily under a big tree in their backyard when they decide to construct a large roller coaster. With their mother Linda (Caroline Rhea) at the grocery store, their sister Candace (Ashley Tisdale) wants to catch them in the act and "bust" them.

Candace goes to the store to tell their Mom of the boys' activity, though she is keen on neglecting it, while their neighbor and best friend Isabella (Alyson Stoner) goes up to Phineas and asks "Whatcha doin'?". Phineas and Ferb begin working on the coaster. Meanwhile, Phineas and Ferb's pet platypus Perry (Dee Bradley Baker) performs his act as a "secret agent" codenamed Agent P, being informed by his boss Major Francis Monogram (Jeff "Swampy" Marsh) that an evil scientist named Dr. Heinz Doofenshmirtz (Dan Povenmire) has bought 80% of the Tri-State Area's tin foil. Perry darts off to investigate what Dr. Doofenshmirtz is doing.

With their rollercoaster finally finished, Phineas and Ferb unveil it to the neighborhood children, including Isabella. The children ride the rollercoaster, which twists around the city.

Doofenshmirtz, meanwhile, reveals that he is using the tin foil to cover the eastern seaboard, then using a magnet to pull it, thereby reversing the Earth's rotation with the Magnetism Magnifier. Perry fights him, but Doofenshmirtz manages to get the magnet activating. However, Doofenshmirtz soon learns that his plan is flawed because the magnet has only taken the tin foil off the eastern seaboard, forming it into a 2-ton giant ball. Seeing that it's heading forward, Doofenshmirtz and Perry attempt to separate the magnet from his machine to stop it.

Perry attempts to solve the problem by hooking the magnet to a helicopter, causing the magnet to go with it. This attempt is unsuccessful, and Doofenshmirtz and the top of his building are sent throwing away by the tin foil ball. The magnet attracts the Magnetism Magnifier, which picks up the entire rollercoaster, preventing Linda from seeing it. Perry cuts the cable, making the rollercoaster drop to the ground, then jumps into the rollercoaster while placing his hat onto Isabella to avoid blowing his cover. Phineas looks behind him and utters, "Oh, there you are, Perry." The rollercoaster reaches the broken end of the track and starts flying across the world and into space, Candace who had unsuccessfully been trying to get her mother to see the rollercoaster, makes her mother drive home to see that Phineas and Ferb are not there. However, the rollercoaster lands back on Earth and into the tree in their backyard, with the rollercoaster stuck in the tree but Phineas and Ferb fall out, leaving Linda able to see her children but not the rollercoaster. As the other children fall out of the tree, the episode ends with Isabella having a friendly conversation with the stepbrothers before returning home, as the rollercoaster explodes and the giant tin foil ball is rolling around town.

Production

Conception

Series co-creator Dan Povenmire attributed the genesis for the show to his childhood in Mobile, Alabama. Povenmire recalled that his mother told him "never to waste a day of summer". Meanwhile, the show's other co-creator, Jeff "Swampy" Marsh grew up in a large, blended family. Similar to Povenmire, Marsh spent his summers exploring and taking part in several different activities in order to have fun. The two met while working as layout artists on The Simpsons in the 1990s. Povenmire commented that "We were always laughing at the same jokes". The two became a writing team on the Nickelodeon animated series Rocko's Modern Life. They began working on Phineas and Ferb around 1992, while still working together at Nickelodeon. The two had become friends due to their mutual tastes and interests. Citing their childhood, they wanted to incorporate summer vacations, a time when the two would go out and do something constructive. They spent sixteen years pitching it to four different networks, including Nickelodeon and Cartoon Network, all of which kept shooting it down due to its complexity. When Povenmire landed a pitch with Disney, despite being unsure at first, the series was accepted.

Povenmire and Marsh both wrote "Rollercoaster", and used it as the pitch for the entire series. Unlike normal series, they did not send a script to the overseas Disney executives, but set up a storyboard and mixed it over with dialogue by Povenmire, then set up a "play-by-play" and recorded it. The series was accepted after 16 years of development and the episode was produced. Several lines and scenes from the storyboard were removed or altered in the eventual production of the episode. Several such scenes were eventually used in later episodes, such as a scene later used in the episode "Gaming the System", in which Doofenshmirtz waits a few seconds, until precisely 11:00, before initiating his plan. Povenmire and Marsh wanted to include two things in every episode; a song, and an action or chase scene. However, the song in every episode did not begin until "Flop Starz", the next episode.

Casting
Vincent Martella, Thomas Sangster, and Ashley Tisdale, who voice Phineas, Ferb, and Candace respectively, were all hired by the casting department because of their popularity within the target age-group and general belief in their ability to perform their roles. Another character, Jeremy, who is usually voiced by Mitchel Musso, briefly appeared in the episode in a different voice than usual from an unknown voice extra. The end credits of the episode list several extras who possibly voiced him, including Dee Bradley Baker (who voiced Perry the Platypus), Raviv Ullman, and the co-creators. The episode used live action briefly in the shot in which the kids fall to Earth, a technique featured in two other episodes to date: Out to Launch and The Chronicles of Meap.

Broadcast
The episode originally aired as a preview after the premiere of High School Musical 2 on August 17, 2007, with a rating of TV-Y7. Disney Channel wanted to start off the series in a special way, though they did not use "Rollercoaster"; instead, they chose the episode "Flop Starz", and aired it in a worldwide premiere.

Reception
When originally aired on August 17, 2007, "Rollercoaster" peaked high ratings in several categories. The preview garnered a recorded amount of 10.8 million viewers. 4.15 million were in the demographic of kids 6–11, while 4.20 million were in their teens 9–14 category. These high ratings lead to the episode being the second highest-rated telecast Disney Channel received in its recorded history.

Related episodes
The events of "Rollercoaster" would be revisited in the season 2 episode "Phineas and Ferb's Quantum Boogaloo", which sees a future adult version of Candace returning to the events of the episode in a time machine to help her present counterpart successfully bust Phineas and Ferb for the rollercoaster. However, this action led to a chain reaction that soon followed, turning the future version of Danville into a dystopian society led by subplot antagonist Dr. Heinz Doofenshmirtz. Later, the same Candace goes back into the past to stop the adult Candace from causing the disaster.

The Phineas and Ferb spin-off series Milo Murphy's Law episode "Murphy's Lard" references this episode; in a flashback, when the rollercoaster drops to the ground, it almost crushes Melissa, giving her a fear of rollercoasters.

Notes

References

External links

Official Phineas and Ferb website

Phineas and Ferb episodes
2007 American television episodes
American television series premieres